The 1970–71 SK Rapid Wien season was the 73rd season in club history.

Squad

Squad and statistics

Squad statistics

Fixtures and results

League

Cup

References

1970-71 Rapid Wien Season
Rapid